Kazakhstan, having become independent in 1991, made its Paralympic Games début at the 1994 Winter Paralympics in Lillehammer, with merely two athletes competing in cross-country skiing and biathlon. The country has competed in every edition of the Summer and Winter Paralympics since then. Kazakhstan has obtained only one Paralympic medal: a silver in cross-country skiing, won by Lubov Vorobieva during the country's inaugural participation in the Games in 1994. Along with Liechtenstein, Kazakhstan was the only participating country to have won a medal only at the Winter Paralympic Games, until end to 2016.

Medals

Medals by Summer Games

Medals by Winter Games

Medals by Summer Sport

Medals by Winter Sport

Medallists

Summer Games

Winter Games

See also
 Kazakhstan at the Olympics

References